Guy Savoy (born 24 July 1953) is a French chef who is the head chef and owner of the eponymous Guy Savoy restaurant in Paris and its sister restaurant in Las Vegas, both of which have gained multiple Michelin stars. He owns three other restaurants in Paris. Rather unexpectedly, it was announced on 27 February 2023 by Michelin, only days before the release of the 2023 Michelin Guide for France, that Savoy’s eponymous flagship 3 Michelin star restaurant in Paris would be demoted to 2 stars, sparking shock and outrage across the country.

Biography
Guy Savoy was born on 24 July 1953 in Nevers. In 1955, his parents moved to Bourgoin-Jallieu, a town in Isère, where his father was a gardener and his mother owned a taproom that she would transform into a restaurant. After a three-year apprenticeship with the Troisgros brothers and multiple experiences at prestigious restaurants, he opened his own restaurant in New York before opening in rue Duret, Paris, in 1980, which received two Michelin stars in 1985.
He earned his third Michelin star in 2002. In 2017, 2018, 2019 and 2020, La Liste named his restaurant at 11 quai de Conti the Best Restaurant in the World.

He is married to Danielle Savoy and has two children: Caroline (born 21 January 1978) and Franck (born 4 June 1979). 

Gordon Ramsay was trained under Guy Savoy, and has described him as his culinary mentor.

He recorded the voice of sous-chef Horst for the French version of the Pixar animated film Ratatouille, released in August 2007.

He is on the board of directors of the French Mission for Food Culture & Heritage (Mission Française du Patrimoine et des Cultures Alimentaires), which successfully applied for inscription of the "gastronomic meal of the French" on UNESCO's Representative List of the Intangible Cultural Heritage of Humanity.

In 2017 and 2018, he was a member of the Prix Versailles World Judges Panel.

Restaurants
 Flagship
 Restaurant Guy Savoy – Monnaie de Paris, 11 Quai de Conti – 6th arrondissement of Paris
 Restaurant Guy Savoy – Las Vegas, United States

 Other
 Atelier Maître Albert – 5th arrondissement of Paris
 Le Chiberta – 8th arrondissement of Paris
 Supu Ramen – 6th arrondissement of Paris

Awards and accolades
Savoy received the Legion d’Honneur medal in 2008.

The Las Vegas restaurant has garnered two Michelin stars, the AAA Five Diamond Award, the Forbes Five Star Award, and the Wine Spectator Grand Award.

In 2018, he won the Prix du Rayonnement Gastronomique Français (French Influence Award for Gastronomy).

Restaurant Guy Savoy in Paris was awarded its third Michelin star in 2002. The restaurant was ranked amongst the Restaurant Top 50 Restaurants in the world in 2004 and 2005.

In 2020, La Liste named it the Best Restaurant in the World for the fourth year in a row. It has five Gault Millau toques and three Pudlowski Guide plates, and is ranked amongst the "best restaurants in Paris" in the Lebey Guide.

Books
Vegetable Magic with Guy Langlois, Ebury Press (1987) 
Guy Savoy: Simple French Recipes for the Home Cook (2004)

References

External links
 Restaurant Guy Savoy website
 Atelier Maître Albert website
 Le Chiberta website
 Supu Ramen website

1953 births
Living people
People from Nevers
French chefs
Head chefs of Michelin starred restaurants